Antin Ivanovych Manastyrsky (November 2, 1878 – May 15, 1969) was a Ukrainian folk artist, painter, and graphic artist. He is the father of artist Vitold Manastyrsky.

Manastyrsky was born in the village of Zavaliv, now Ternopil Raion of Ternopil Oblast (then part of the Austro-Hungarian Empire), in the family of a postal official. He graduated from the Lviv Art-Industrial School and later the Krakow Academy of Fine Arts.

In 1900, the Society for the Advancement of the Ruthenian Work, which Manastyrsky was a member of, staged an exhibition of his first paintings. Since that time, he began his artistic career. He paints a whole gallery of high-spiritual works - landscapes, contemporary reality, and satires. Manastyrsky lived and worked in Lviv.

Manastyrsky died May 15, 1969, and was buried in a family tomb at the Lychakiv cemetery.

External links
Manastyrsky Antin / Entry in the Encyclopedia of Ukraine

1878 births
1969 deaths
People from Ternopil Oblast
Ukrainian Austro-Hungarians
People from the Kingdom of Galicia and Lodomeria
Ukrainian artists
Soviet painters
Ukrainian academics
Jan Matejko Academy of Fine Arts alumni
Burials at Lychakiv Cemetery
Austro-Hungarian artists